The Houston Hurricanes are an American professional Twenty20 franchise cricket team that compete in Minor League Cricket (MiLC). The team is based in Houston, Texas. It was formed in 2020 as part of 24 original teams to compete in Minor League Cricket. The franchise is owned by Tanweer Ahmed and Mangesh Chaudhari.

The team's home ground is Prairie View Cricket Complex, located in Prairie View, Texas. Usman Rafiq was named as captain, while Willem Ludick was named as vice-captain for the team.

The current leading run-scorer is Willem Ludick, with the highest wicket-taker being Karthik Gattepalli.

Franchise history

Background 
Talks of an American Twenty20 league started in November 2018 just before USA Cricket became the new governing body of cricket in the United States. In May 2021, USA Cricket announced they had accepted a bid by American Cricket Enterprises (ACE) for a US$1 billion investment covering the league and other investments benefitting the U.S. national teams.

In an Annual General Meeting on February 21, 2020, it was announced that USA Cricket was planning to launch Major League Cricket in 2021 and Minor League Cricket that summer, but it was delayed due to the COVID-19 pandemic and due to the lack of high-quality cricket stadiums in the USA. Major League Cricket was pushed to a summer-2023 launch and Minor League Cricket was pushed back to July 31, 2021.

USA Cricket CEO Iain Higgins pointed out cities such as New York City, Houston and Los Angeles with a large cricket fanbase, and targeted them among others as launch cities for Minor League Cricket.

Exhibition league 

In July 2020, the player registration for the Minor League Cricket exhibition league began. On August 15, 2020, USA Cricket announced the teams participating in the exhibition league matches, also listing the owners for each team. The draft for the exhibition league began on August 22, 2020, with the Houston Hurricanes releasing their squad on August 24. Usman Rafiq was later named as captain for the Houston Hurricanes in the exhibition league.

The exhibition matches kicked off on September 12, with the Houston Hurricanes losing their first match to the Irving Mustangs by 75 runs. The Houston Hurricanes then went on to concede 3 wins and 2 losses, placing 3rd throughout the exhibition league in the Central Division.

2021 season 

After the conclusion of the exhibition league, USA Cricket announced that they were planning to launch the inaugural season of Minor League Cricket in spring 2021. Ahead of the official season, which was announced to kick off on July 31, they announced Usman Rafiq as captain and Willem Ludick as vice-captain.

In their first match of the season, the Houston Hurricanes defeated the Austin Athletics chasing down a total of 175 in the 20th over, winning the match by 3 wickets. They then went on to win their next 3 games by 4 wickets, 50 runs, and 76 runs respectively, until they went on to concede their first loss of the season against the Michigan Cricket Stars. Over the following weeks, the Houston Hurricanes won 8 more matches, and lost 2 more matches, thus qualifying them for the quarter-finals.

In the quarter-finals, they faced the Golden State Grizzlies in a best-of-three series, losing the series 2-0, and placing 3rd in the league.

2022 season 
Ahead of the 2022 season, MLC announced that the draft for that season would take place on May 12.

In January 2023, MLC announced that the Hurricanes would play a three-game series at the Quetta Gladiators of the Pakistan Super League.

Current squad 
 Players with international caps are listed in bold.
  denotes a player who is currently unavailable for selection.
  denotes a player who is unavailable for rest of the season

Statistics

Most runs 

Source: CricClubs, Last updated: 21 September 2021

Most wickets 

Source: CricClubs, Last updated: 21 September 2021

See also 
 Minor League Cricket
 Major League Cricket

References 

Minor League Cricket teams
Sports teams in Houston
Cricket clubs established in 2020
2020 establishments in Texas